Millettia lacus-alberti is a species of plant in the family Fabaceae. It is found in Democratic Republic of the Congo and Uganda.

References

lacus-alberti
Flora of the Democratic Republic of the Congo
Flora of Uganda
Vulnerable plants
Taxonomy articles created by Polbot